An ice bridge is a frozen natural structure formed over seas, bays, rivers or lake surfaces. They facilitate migration of animals or people over a water body that was previously uncrossable by terrestrial animals, including humans. The most significant ice bridges are formed by glaciation, spanning distances of many miles over sometimes relatively deep water bodies. 

An example of such a major ice bridge was that connecting the island of Öland with mainland Sweden approximately 9000 BC. This bridge reached its maximum utility when the glacier was in retreat, forming a low-lying frozen bridge. The Öland ice bridge allowed the first human migration to the island of Öland, which is most readily documented by archaeological studies of the Alby People.

In Jules Verne's 1873 novel The Fur Country, a group of fur trappers establishes a fort on what they think is stable ground, only to find later on that is merely an iceberg temporarily attached by an ice bridge to the mainland.

See also
 Ice road
 Land bridge

References

Human migration
Glaciers
Bodies of ice